Roy Davis may refer to:

Roy Davis Jr., recording artist specializing in house music
Peaches Davis (Roy Thomas Davis, 1905–1995), American baseball player
Roy T. Davis (1889–1975), American diplomat
Roy Elonzo Davis (1890–1966), Imperial Wizard of the Original Knights of the Ku Klux Klan
Roy Eugene Davis (1931–2019), American spiritual teacher and author
Roy Davis (writer), comic writer of Wonder Wellies

See also
Roy Davies (disambiguation)